Menar may refer to:
 Menar, Ilam
 Menar, Khuzestan
 Menar, Lorestan
Minar (Firuzabad), a tower-like structure at the center of the Sassanian city of Gor (Firuzabad)

See also
Minar